Legislative elections to elect the members of the ninth Imperial Council were held in March 1897 in Cisleithania, the northern and western ("Austrian") crown lands of Austria-Hungary. These elections were first in Cisleithania held under the curial system with universal, but still not equal, suffrage.

Badeni electoral reform
Count Kasimir Felix Badeni had led the Cisleithanian government since 1895. In February 1896, the government submitted a proposal for fundamental reform of the electoral system. The so-called Badeni electoral reform kept the curial electoral system, but in addition to four existing curiae (landowners, trade and industry chambers, large and medium farmers, and male city residents who were annually paying at least 10 guilders of taxes), the fifth, general curiae, was added. While voting rights were limited in the four original curiae (fiscally defined, therefore, allowing voting to only those who have paid taxes on prescribed minimum amount), the fifth curia included all men older than 24. In May 1896, Badeni electoral reform was approved by the Imperial Council.

Results
Voting took place in several stages during March 1897, with the last elections being held in the fifth curiae on March 12, 1897.

The elections significantly changed relations in the Imperial Council, with a strong trend in the degradation of the original dominant German Progressive Party being set. This trend went in favor of the newly founded German People's Party and the Christian Social Party. The elections also brought a further fragmentation of the political scene; the three strongest parliamentary clubs (Young Czechs, Polish Club, and German Progressive Party) had only 168 seats, and the new Imperial Council had 17 parliamentary clubs. Meanwhile, the Social Democrats were still weakening, winning only 15 seats.

Seats
In May 1897 the Imperial Council had 16 political groups and individual parties:

Aftermath
After the elections, Badeni tried to negotiate with the aim of creating a stable pro-government parliamentary majority. However, he did not consider the German Progressive Party or the radical nationalist Pan-German League, but preferred to try to gain support among conservative German-Austrian politicians, including the liberal German Constitutional Party. After the German Constitutional Party refused to give support to the minority government, Badeni announced on April 2, 1897 that his government would resign, but did not go through with the resignation. Meanwhile, negotiations on forming a government continued. On April 4, a framework agreement was set, effectively restoring the conservative so-called Iron Circle from the 1880s, which consisted of the German Catholic People's Party, the Young Czech Party, the Polish club and the Czech Party of Conservative Landowners. Badeni remained Prime Minister. However, the government did not last long as Badeni resigned on November 28, 1897 under the pressure from the German nationalists over the language regulations.

References

1897 elections in Europe
1897
1897 in Austria-Hungary
March 1897 events